Bokajan is a town in Karbi Anglong district in the state of Assam, India. Bokajan is best known for its Cement factory (Cement Corporation of India, Bokajan). It is 15 km away from Dimapur and partially borders Nagaland.

Geography
It has an average elevation of 138 metres (452 feet).

Demographics
 India census, Bokajan had a population of 19,936. Males constitute 53% of the population and females 47%. Bokajan has an average literacy rate of 86.77%, higher than the national average of 74.04%; with male literacy of 80% and female literacy of 68%. 12% of the population is under 6 years of age.

Language

 
Bengali is the most spoken language at 6,725 speakers, followed by Assamese at 4,541 and Hindi at 4,461, Karbi is spoken by 1,062 people and Nepali by 1,413.

Economy

Industry

Bokajan CCI
The Bokajan Cement Factory is one of the 3 functional cement factory in India, out of its 10 cement factories of  Cement Corporation of India Limited (CCI), which are fully owned by the Central Govt. of India.
Annually, the plant produces around 198,000 MT by using the dry process. 
The factory occupy an area that consist of the factory, the mining area and the township. The township consists of various civic amenities such as health centres, guest houses, bank, post office, telephone exchange and so on.

Agriculture
Most of the populace income is based on agriculture.

Education
Notable educational institutions include Eastern Karbi Anglong College and Kendriya Vidyalaya.

Sports

A wide array of sports are played in Bokajan, the most popular among them being football, chess, Karate.

Bokajan Chess Academy is run by former state champion and National level Player Rintu Brahma.

Politics
Bokajan is part of Autonomous District (Lok Sabha constituency).

References

External links
 Kendriya Vidyalaya, Bokajan (project C.C.I Bokajan)

Cities and towns in Karbi Anglong district
Karbi Anglong district